The First Invasion of Onitsha (October 4 − October 12, 1967) was a large military conflict between Biafran and Nigerian forces. The Nigerian 2nd Division managed to seize control of Onitsha for less than one day before being massacred by Biafran soldiers.

Prelude

On September 20, 1967, the Nigerian 2nd Division under General Murtala Muhammed forced all Biafran soldiers within Nigeria's Mid-Western Region to retreat eastwards back towards Biafra. In an attempt to halt the Nigerian advance retreating Biafran soldiers destroyed the River Niger Bridge at Onitsha, trapping the Nigerians on the other side of the river. In October 1967 2nd Division soldiers entered Asaba and began setting up artillery positions on the banks of the Niger River while 2nd Division soldiers began preparing for an invasion.

Invasion

The Biafran 11th Division, which consisted of the 11th, 12th and 18th Battalions, was given the task of defending Onitsha. The 12th Battalion under Col. Mike Inveso was responsible for defending the area between Idah and Nsugbe, the 18th Battalion under Col. Assam Nsudoh was responsible for defending Onitsha town, and the 11th Battalion under Maj. Joseph Achuzie defended the area between Atani and Ndoni. The beaches around Onitsha were heavily mined and were backed up by Biafran machine guns and anti-tank weapons. Because the Biafrans had detonated the Niger River Bridge Gen. Murtala Muhammed was left with the decision of crossing the Niger River at Idah or making and amphibious attack on Onitsha. Gen. Muhammed disregarded advice from the Nigerian Army HQ in Lagos and chose to attack Onitsha head on. On October 4, 1967, Gen. Muhammed ordered Nigerian artillery to begin bombarding Onitsha. Eight days later Gen. Muhammed personally lead a 10-boat armada carrying 5,000 Nigerian soldiers across the Niger River into Onitsha. The Biafran 18th Battalion resisted stubbornly but were forced to retreat in disarray. However, instead of pursuing the retreating Biafrans and occupying the town the Nigerians turned their attention to looting and burning the Onitsha Market to the ground. This gave the 18th Battalion time to reorganize and make a counter-attack. The 11th Battalion under Maj. Achuzie made their way up the New Market road while the 18th Battalion under Col. Nsudoh swung down the Old Market road towards Onitsha. Nigerian 2nd Division soldiers stationed in Onitsha were totally routed and most were either killed or taken prisoner. Undaunted, Gen. Muhammed ordered a 5,000 man reserve from Lagos to cross the Niger River into Onitsha but they were once again defeated. Gen. Muhammed ordered troops under Lt. Col. Ipoola Alani Akinrinade to make a third assault on Onitsha but were once again thwarted by the Biafran 11th and 18th Battalions. It was now when Gen. Muhammed realized there was no hope in attacking Onitsha from Asaba and began heading north towards Idah.

Aftermath

On November 19, 1967, mercenaries from the Soviet Union and United Arab Republic flying MiG-17s began bombing areas around Onitsha, devastating the civilian population. In December 1967 the Nigerian 2nd Division and 6th Battalion under Gen. Murtala Muhammed crossed the Niger River at Idah and stationed in Enugu. On January 2, 1968, the Nigerians moved towards Onitsha in a two pronged attack launched from two axes. The 2nd Division rolled through Biafran held territory including numerous towns and cities. On January 19 Nigerian troops attacked and occupied Awka, giving the 2nd Division a direct route to Onitsha. The Biafran 11th Division under Maj. Joseph Achuzie fought fiercely against the Nigerians and managed to hold them off for over 3 months before Abagana was captured on March 20 followed by Onitsha less than 24 hours later.

References

Nigerian Civil War
Onitsha
1967 in Nigeria
October 1967 events in Africa
Onitsha